The 2007 season of Liga de Fútbol Profesional Boliviano was the 50th season of top-tier football in Bolivia. The 2007 annual season had the 35th (Apertura 2007) and the 36th (Clausura 2007) tournament of LFPB's history. The Apertura tournament started on March 6 and finished on June 13. The Clausura tournament was played between August and December. Bolívar and Wilstermann will be defending the championships obtained in the 2006 annual season.

Teams and venues

CONMEBOL qualification

Relegation 
At the end of the year the team with the lowest point average (points / games played) from the past annual season (2006) and the current one (2007) is relegated to its respective regional tournament. The team with the 2nd lowest point average faces a playoff against the 2nd placed team in the Copa Simón Bolívar.

Torneo Apertura 
Twelve clubs play in double round-robin format (home and away), a total of 22 games each. A club receives 3 points for a win, 1 point for a tie, and 0 points for a loss. The clubs are ranked by points, and tie breakers are, in the following order: goal difference, goals scored, head-to-head results.

Torneo Clausura

Group stage

Group 1

Group 2

Final group 

NB: La Paz FC and The Strongest started with 1 bonus point for winning their respective groups in the first phase

Play-offs

Championship

Torneo de la Liga 

La Paz FC join Real Potosí and San José in the Copa Libertadores 2008, while losers Bolívar join Blooming in the Copa Sudamericana 2008

 Real Potosí and San José qualified to the 2008 Copa Libertadores Second Stage.
 La Paz qualified to the 2008 Copa Libertadores First Stage.
 Blooming qualified to the 2008 Copa Sudamericana First Stage.
 Bolívar qualified to the 2008 Copa Sudamericana Preliminary.

Promotion/relegation

Second leg 

Aurora win 5-2 on aggregate. Aurora remain at the top level.

See also 
 Bolivia national football team 2007

References 
 Soccerway Page
 RSSSF Page

Bolivian Primera División seasons
Bolivia
1